The Cágado River is a river of Minas Gerais state in southeastern Brazil. It rises in Chácara in the Serra da Mantiqueira and flows  to its mouth on the Paraibuna between Santana do Deserto and Chiador.

See also
List of rivers of Minas Gerais

References

 Map from Ministry of Transport
 Rand McNally, The New International Atlas, 1993.

Rivers of Minas Gerais